Isaac Dunbar is an alternative pop singer-songwriter from Barnstable, Massachusetts. He signed with RCA Records in 2019.

Early life
He is of Italian and Liberian descent. Dunbar is unlabeled (confirmed in his recent TikTok video) 

Isaac first started making music when he was nine, creating EDM music. As a big Lady Gaga fan, he was further inspired to learn music production when he discovered the music of Madeon (one of the producers working on Gaga's Artpop). He learned synths and music theory through tutorials on YouTube and by reproducing songs from Artpop.

Career
On 31 October 2017, the blog We Are Going Solo reposted his track "Pharmacy", drawing wider attention to his work. In late 2018 his tracks "Freshman Year" (which debuted on The Fader on 2 October) and "Blonde" attracted further notice, with an additional boost when "Pharmacy" was featured on Zane Lowe's Beats 1 radio show. On 12 February 2019, Wonderland debuted his single "Mime".

In July 2019 he released his debut EP Balloons Don't Float Here, and Complex premiered his single "Ferrari." In the fall of that year he toured with Girl in Red, and in November he appeared on MTV's PUSH Live concert series.

In October 2019, RCA Records signed him, scheduling his debut on the label, Isaac's Insects, for April 2020. The title track was released in January 2020, and that month he was named to Idolator's list of artists to watch and E!News' "Future Pop Stars You Need to Know Now."Paper then premiered and Billboard featured the followup video for "Makeup Drawer," a track he'd written when he was 14 that had major significance for Isaac as he "explained that he'd been waiting to release this song until he was ready to get honest about his experience with homophobia." Isaac's Insects was released on April 9, 2020.

His U.S. and European tour was set to begin on 14 April 2020 at Moroccan Lounge in Los Angeles, but it was postponed due to the COVID-19 pandemic.

Discography

Extended plays

Singles

Notes
 All extended play titles are stylized in all lowercase, except Banish the Banshee.
 All track titles are stylized in all lowercase, except "God, This Feels Good", “Bleach”, "Tainted Love" and “Fool’s Paradise”.

Sources

Living people
21st-century American singers
American people of Italian descent
American people of Liberian descent
People from Barnstable, Massachusetts
RCA Records artists
Singers from Massachusetts
2003 births
American gay musicians
21st-century LGBT people
American LGBT singers
LGBT people from Massachusetts